This is a list of notable half marathon races. According to Running Times Magazine, There were approximately 870 half marathons in the United States in 2009.



0-9
 3M Half Marathon (Austin, Texas, USA)
 21K Buenos Aires (Buenos Aires, Argentina)

A
 Air Force Half Marathon (Dayton, Ohio, USA)
 Adana Half Marathon (Adana, Turkey)
 America's Finest City Half Marathon (San Diego, California, USA)
 Invesco QQQ Half Marathon (Atlanta, Georgia, USA) 
 Airtel Delhi Half Marathon (ADHM, Delhi, India)

B
 Bangsaen21 Half Marathon (Bang Saen, Thailand)
 Barrathon (Barra, Scotland)
 Bath Half Marathon (Bath, England)
 Belgrade Half Marathon (Belgrade, Serbia)
 Berlin Half Marathon (Berlin, Germany)
 Birmingham Half Marathon (Birmingham, England)
 Bogotá Half Marathon, (Bogotá, Colombia)
 Brass Monkey Half Marathon (York, England)
 Brighton Half Marathon (Brighton, England)
 Bristol Half Marathon (Bristol, England)
 Budapest Half Marathon (Budapest, Hungary)

C
 Cardiff Half Marathon (Cardiff, Wales)
 Chester Half Marathon (Chester)
 Chicago Half Marathon (Chicago)
 City-Pier-City Loop (the Hague, Netherlands)
 City of Norwich Half Marathon (Norwich, England)
 Copenhagen Half Marathon (Copenhagen, Denmark)
 Cowtown Half Marathon (Fort Worth, Texas, USA)

E
 Edinburgh Marathon Festival Half Marathon (Edinburgh, Scotland)

F
 Fleet Half Marathon (Fleet, Hampshire, England)
 Four Villages Half Marathon (Helsby, England)
 Freckleton Half Marathon (Freckleton, England)

G
 Göteborgsvarvet (Gothenburg, Sweden)
 Great Eastern Run (Peterborough, England)
 Great North Run (Newcastle upon Tyne, England)
 Great North West Half Marathon (Blackpool, England)
 Great Scottish Run (Glasgow, Scotland)
 Great West Run (Exeter, England)
 Greifenseelauf (Uster, Switzerland)
 Guwahati Half Marathon (Guwahati, India)

H
 Hastings Half Marathon (Hastings, England)
 Helsinki City Run (Helsinki, Finland)
 Hong Kong Marathon (Hong Kong, Hong Kong)

I
 Invesco QQQ Half Marathon (Atlanta, Georgia (Georgia State Stadium)
 Istanbul Half Marathon (Istanbul, Turkey)

K
 Kuldīga Half Marathon (Kuldīga, Latvia)
 Kärnten läuft (Klagenfurt, Austria)

L
 Lake Vyrnwy Half Marathon (Lake Vyrnwy, Wales)
 Lisbon Half Marathon (Lisbon, Portugal)
 Liverpool Half Marathon (Liverpool, England)

M
 Madeline Island Half-Marathon (La Pointe, Wisconsin, USA)
 Maidenhead Half Marathon (Maidenhead, Berkshire, United Kingdom)
 Marine Corps Historic Half (Fredericksburg, Virginia, USA)
 Marseille-Cassis Classique Internationale (Marseille, France)

N
 Naples Half Marathon (Naples, Florida, USA)
 New York City Half Marathon (New York, USA)

O
 OneAmerica 500 Festival Mini-Marathon (Indianapolis, Indiana)

P
 Paddock Wood Half Marathon (Paddock Wood, Kent, UK)
 Philadelphia Distance Run (Philadelphia, Pennsylvania, USA)
 Polar Night Halfmarathon (Tromsø, Norway)
 Porto Half Marathon (Porto, Portugal)
 Prague Half Marathon (Prague, Czech Republic)

R
 RAK Half Marathon (Ras al-Khaimah, United Arab Emirates)
 Reading Half Marathon (Reading, England)
 Robin Hood Marathon (Nottingham, England)
 Rock ‘n’ Roll San Jose Half Marathon (San Jose, California, USA)
 Rock 'n' Roll Virginia Beach Half Marathon (Virginia Beach, Virginia, USA)
 Rocky River Run (Rockhampton, Queensland, Australia)
 Roma-Ostia (Rome, Italy)
 Rotterdam Half Marathon (Rotterdam, Netherlands)
 Royal Parks Half Marathon (London, England)
 Run to the Beat (London, England)

S
 San Diego Half Marathon (San Diego, California, USA)
 Semi-Marathon de Paris (Paris, France)
 Sheffield Half Marathon (Sheffield, England)
 Silverstone Half Marathon (Northamptonshire, England)
 SMH half marathon (Sydney, NSW, Australia)
 Stramilano (Milan, Italy)
 Stroud Half Marathon (Stroud, England)
 Stuttgarter Zeitung-Lauf (Stuttgart, Germany)

T
 Tarsus Half Marathon (Tarsus, Mersin, Turkey)
 Tunbridge Wells Half Marathon (Tunbridge Wells, England)
 Two Oceans Half Marathon (Cape Town, South Africa)

V
 Valencia Half Marathon (Valencia, Spain)

W
 WhistleStop Half Marathon (Ashland, Wisconsin, USA)
 Wilmslow Half Marathon (Wilmslow, England)
 Windsor Half Marathon (Windsor, England)
 Wokingham Half Marathon (Wokingham, England)

See also
List of marathon races
IAAF World Road Running Championships
IAAF Road Race Label Events
World Marathon Majors

Notes

References

External links
IAAF World Half Marathon Championships

Sport of athletics-related lists